Nutrioso is an unincorporated community and census-designated place (CDP) in Apache County, Arizona, United States. Nutrioso has a post office with ZIP code 85932. As of the 2010 census, the population was 26.

History
Nutrioso's name is derived from the Spanish word Nutria ("Otter"). The early Spanish colonists referred to beaver as "nutria", perhaps because the Eurasian beaver had been extinct in Spain since the 17th century. On August 2, 1776 Francisco Silvestre Vélez de Escalante wrote in his diary, "...we halted in a small plain on the bank of another arroyo which is called Rio de las Nutrias, because, although it is of permanent and running water, apparently during all or most of the year it stands in pools where they say beavers breed." The first settlers in the area either killed an otter and a bear (Oso in Spanish) and took the name from that incident, killed a beaver and a bear and misused the term "Nutria" or killed just a beaver and used the term "Nutrioso" to mean "Of Beavers".

Nutrioso rose in importance as Mormon refugees relocated here after other nearby settlements were attacked by Native American groups. By 1880, a fort had been constructed, and by 1883 a post office was established.

Demographics

See also

 List of census-designated places in Arizona

References

External links

Census-designated places in Apache County, Arizona